Yolanda T. Marshall is a Canadian author of children's books.

Early life
Marshall, the oldest of three sisters, was born in Guyana and grew up in Scarborough, Toronto. Her family moved to Canada when she was 14. Her father is a jazz musician.

Writing
Marshall's first children's book, Keman’s First Carnival, was published in 2016. Her children's books generally center around children partaking in elements of Caribbean culture, such as food and music. Her books include:

 A Piece of Black Cake for Santa (2017), where children give Santa sorrel and black cake;
 My Soca Birthday Party (2020). A girl has a birthday party with plenty of Caribbean and African food and music; CBC.ca called it one of "the best Canadian picture books of 2020."
 C is for Carnival (2021), an A to Z book about children at the Toronto Caribbean Carnival.
 Hot Cross Buns For Everyone (2022), about children baking hot cross buns and having an Easter party.

She has also written two books of poetry, Obayifo (2008) and Messages on Dried Leaves (2017).

Personal life
Marshall lives in Scarborough, Toronto. She has a son, who inspired several of her books. As of 2020, she works in academic publishing.

References

External links
 
 Marshall reads from her book Miles Away In The Caribbean at Bibleovideo
 This children’s book highlights Caribbean holiday traditions, 2021 interview on Breakfast Television

Living people
Canadian women children's writers
21st-century Canadian women writers
21st-century Guyanese writers
Year of birth missing (living people)
Writers_from_Scarborough,_Toronto
Black_Canadian_writers